Anne Marsh may refer to:

 Anne Marsh-Caldwell (1791–1874), English novelist
 Anne Marsh (artist), Australian sculptor and feminist art theorist
 Anne Steele Marsh (1901–1995), American painter and printmaker

See also
 Ann Marsh (born 1971), American fencer